The Mulwala Bridge is a road bridge over Lake Mulwala, formed by a weir on the Murray River, on the state border between New South Wales and Victoria in Australia. The bridge links the border towns of Yarrawonga in Victoria and Mulwala in New South Wales. The bridge was built in 1924 and designed by Percy Allan using a Pratt truss.

See also 

 List of crossings of the Murray River
 List of bridges in Australia

References

External links

Crossings of the Murray River
Road bridges in New South Wales
Bridges completed in 1924
1924 establishments in Australia
Truss bridges in Australia
Bridges designed by Percy Allan
Allan truss bridges
Borders of New South Wales
Borders of Victoria (Australia)
Bridges in the Riverina